The following is a list of episodes from the American television series Walker, Texas Ranger. A total of 203 episodes aired from April 21, 1993, to May 19, 2001. Although some sources identify the first four episodes aired at the end of the 1992–1993 television season, as the first season (making nine seasons in the series overall), those episodes are included in the Season 1 (1993–94) DVD release and are not acknowledged as a separate season.

Series overview

Episodes

Season 1 (1993–94)

Season 2 (1994–95)

Season 3 (1995–96)

Season 4 (1996–97)

Season 5 (1997–98)

Season 6 (1998–99)
This is the first season to be produced by Norris Bros. Entertainment.

Season 7 (1999–2000)

Season 8 (2000–01)

Television film (2005)

References

External links

Lists of American action television series episodes
Lists of American Western (genre) television series episodes